Big Brother Australia 12, also known as Big Brother 2020, was the twelfth season of the Australian reality television series Big Brother. It began airing on 8 June 2020 on the Seven Network. It was the first season of the show to air on the Seven Network after it bought the rights to the series in 2019, following a six-year absence. The show was originally screened on Network Ten, then the Nine Network. Sonia Kruger returned as the host of the show. 

This season revolved around 20 strangers living in a house together with no communication with the outside world as they competed for $250,000. They were constantly filmed during their time in the house and were not permitted to communicate with those filming them. Unlike earlier seasons, the format of the series was revised to emphasise competition and gameplay, with housemates now competing in challenges for power and safety before voting each other out of the house. When only three housemates were left, the Australian public decided which finalist would win the grand prize. This season was also the first to be completely pre-recorded before airing, except for a live finale.

The series was filmed in late February and March 2020 and aired during June and July 2020 on the Seven Network, culminating in a live finale on 22 July 2020, where Australia voted for model and tradie Chad Hurst to win the series, over Sophie Budack and Daniel Gorringe. Hurst won a cash prize of $234,656. Additionally, Kieran Davidson was bribed out of the game with a cash bribe of $15,344 during the White Room twist, taking that amount from the intended $250,000 grand prize.

Production

On 23 October 2019, Seven Network confirmed it will be reviving the series in 2020. Rumours indicate the series will be closer in format to the American & Canadian versions - particularly given the upfronts trailer featured footage from Big Brother US 17, Big Brother Canada 2 and Big Brother Canada 3 as well as the emphasis on the phrase "Control, Evict, Win" in the promo.

The reboot has been compared to Survivor - in which the politicking and strategising regarding the nomination and eviction processes are not only allowed (being disallowed in earlier iterations) but central to the format. Seven's Director of Programming Angus Ross confirmed there would be no regular live shows on 26 October. It was announced on 5 February 2020 that Sonia Kruger will return to host Big Brother.

The House
The Ten and Nine iterations of the series used a compound located at the Dreamworld theme park, on the Gold Coast, Queensland, as the Big Brother House. It has since been abandoned and vandalised. In June 2019, the house was set ablaze and burnt down entirely. The entire compound was demolished by Dreamworld in August 2019. 

As the original house had burned down, the Seven Network iteration of the series is set to use a location for a new Big Brother House. Pictures of the new house were leaked on 12 February 2020, showing the house is located in a refurbished World War II Warehouse inside Sydney Harbour's North Head near Manly.

The house was officially revealed on 3 June 2020. This season's house has a modern eco-style interior design, featuring living walls and wood panelling as well as LED lighting and screens. A separate activity area adjacent to the main house, dubbed "Big Brother's Basement" would be used to host many of the nomination challenges. Technical changes were also evident in this house. For the first time in the Australian version, camera runs were replaced by AI cameras.

Impact of the COVID-19 pandemic 

On 19 March 2020, it was confirmed that the housemates had been informed of the COVID-19 pandemic off-camera after Endemol Shine Group ordered all Big Brother adaptations in production across the world to break the format's strict rule of being disconnected with current events taking place in the world. 

Days later on 22 March 2020, production of the show was shut down after a crew member had been exposed to a confirmed positive case of COVID-19 pending test results to confirm whether they had contracted the virus. During this time, all camera operators were removed from the house and housemates were filmed exclusively via the rigged cameras which were not tracking movement, while also being allowed to phone home to speak directly with loved ones. On 23 March 2020, the test of the crew member came back negative and it was announced that production would resume the following day. The events of this shutdown were depicted on Episode 13 of the season.

Production of the remainder of the series was then accelerated to avoid any further impacts on production (potentially including the season being cancelled mid-production, as was the case with the live-produced Big Brother Canada 8). Rather than having a nomination challenge and eviction every second or third day, those events then occurred mostly daily, until filming concluded.

As the COVID-19 pandemic was ongoing at the time of the broadcast, the live reunion and winner announcement was also impacted by the pandemic. On the stage, the attending housemates and a small audience of 70 (mostly loved-ones of the housemates) were seated 1.5 metres apart from each other, in regulation with the New South Wales government's COVID-19 restrictions. Additionally, Housemates Laura and Zoe were unable to make the finale due to interstate travel restrictions restricting travel between New South Wales and Victoria resulting from Second Wave and Lockdown in Victoria.

International broadcast
As with previous seasons of the show, the season was also broadcast in New Zealand. The season was broadcast on Three - which also aired the previous two seasons of the show - and premiered on 28 June 2020. This marked the first time the series had aired in primetime in New Zealand since the conclusion of the 2004 season due to the network needing to fill a scheduling gap caused by the COVID-19 pandemic delaying The Block NZ's ninth season to 2021. On 14 July 2020, it was announced due to low ratings, the show would be moving into a later timeslot and would drop to airing two episodes per week. The revised schedule saw the finale air on 25 August 2020.

This season was also broadcast on Finnish stream service Ruutu.fi from 6 December 2020 and two episodes would show every Sunday. Dutch broadcaster RTL revealed that they are going to broadcast Big Brother Australia season 12 on RTL 5, starting from 9 April 2021, only one day after their Dutch-Flemish version ended. And will broadcast every workdays on 9:30 pm.

Format
For this revival series, the format was rebooted to resemble the format of the American & Canadian editions of Big Brother - with housemates determining both Nominations and Evictions. The new format added emphasis to the competitive aspect of surviving the eviction process. As such, the housemates will now be allowed to strategise, politic and collude about the nominations and evictions. However, there will still be key differences compared to the American format, most prominently, no "Power of Veto" was included as part of the format (a staple of the American and Canadian shows), and the Australian public deciding the eventual winner - rather than being decided by a Jury formed of evicted housemates (as is the case on the American and Canadian shows).

 Nominations:  At the start of each round, the housemates compete in a "Nomination Challenge". The winner of the competition has the sole power over the nominations. Immediately after the challenge, the winning housemate will be called to the Diary Room by Big Brother to name three nominees, and provide full reasons for their nominations. When there are 10 Housemates remaining, only two Housemates would be nominated, instead of three.
 Eviction: On eviction night, all housemates must vote to evict one of the nominees, with the exception of the nominating housemate (who will only cast a tie-breaker vote, if required), nor do the nominated housemates vote when there are only two nominees (on account of their votes cancelling the other's out). The eviction vote is by secret ballot, with housemates casting their votes orally in the Diary Room to Big Brother, and must provide a reason for their vote. The nominee with the most votes is evicted from the house. 
 Finale: The final three housemates will face Australia's vote to determine the winner.

Companion Series

Big Brother's Eye Spy

Big Brother's Eye Spy, hosted by Sonia Kruger is a weekly show on the Seven Network's online streaming service 7plus. It features the evicted housemates from the week and will discuss the highlights and will also reveal the votes from the evictions over the week.

The Big Bro Show
The season includes an online companion show which features behind the scenes footage of the series, and is hosted by former Big Brother narrator as well as the host of many of the former companion shows Mike Goldman. The show is hosted via the 7 News website and social media platforms.

Housemates

While some housemates were revealed early via promotion material, the full roster of 20 housemates was revealed one week before the season premiere on 1 June 2020. Twelve housemates entered on day one (episode 1), with an additional eight housemates that entered in two groups of four on day four (episodes two) and day six (episode three), respectively.

Notes

Episodes

Voting history
 This housemate was nominated for this round of eviction.
 This housemate won the Nomination Challenge on this round of eviction.
 This housemate was in a different room of the house and did not participate in this round of eviction.

<div style="overflow:auto; padding:4px;"> 

Notes

Ratings
Ratings data is from OzTAM and represents the viewership from the 5 largest Australian metropolitan centres (Sydney, Melbourne, Brisbane, Perth and Adelaide).

Notes

Notes

References

External links 

2020 Australian television seasons
12
Television series impacted by the COVID-19 pandemic